The 1979 Santiago International Classic was a men's tennis tournament played on outdoor clay courts in Santiago, Chile that was part of the Grand Prix tennis circuit. It was the fourth edition of the tournament and was held from 26 November through 2 December 1979. Second-seeded Hans Gildemeister won the singles title.

Finals

Singles
 Hans Gildemeister defeated  José Higueras 7–5, 5–7, 6–4
 It was Gildemeister's 2nd singles title of the year and of his career.

Doubles
 José Higueras /  Jairo Velasco, Sr. vs.  Álvaro Fillol /  Jaime Fillol divided at 2–2 in third set

References

External links
 ITF tournament edition details

Chilean International
1979 in Chilean sport